Yevgeny Ottovich Gunst (May 26 (Julian) / June 7 (Gregorian), 1877 – January 30, 1950) was a Russian composer, pianist, music essayist and pedagogue. He was the brother of architect Anatoly Gunst.

Biography 
Gunst was born in Moscow to Otto Karlovich Gunst, member of the State Council of Imperial Russia, who had German ancestors. He studied law as well as composition, music theory and piano at the State Conservatory, also having private lessons with renowned composers like Reinhold Glière and Alexander Goldenweiser. In 1909, he co-founded the Moscow Chamber Music Theatre along with Sergei Rachmaninoff amongst others.

In 1920, Gunst had to emigrate to Tallinn (Estonia) before later settling down in Paris. There he co-founded the Conservatoire Rachmaninoff in 1924, but had to leave in 1931 due to political differences. He founded his own conservatory, but soon had to close it as the Great Depression was still ongoing. He worked as an arranger (banking) and copyist in Paris and became a close friend of Francis Poulenc. In 1949, Gunst was about to migrate to the United States, but died in 1950 in Paris at the age of 72.
His estate has been found in 2009, in the basement of the University of Basel's Musicological Institute. Apparently, it was left undiscovered for many decades, as Gunst's widow had bestowed her husband's estate to the institute's director, at that time Jacques Handschin, in the 1950s.

Notes

Free scores 
 

1877 births
1950 deaths
Composers from the Russian Empire
Moscow Conservatory alumni
Russian Romantic composers
Pianists from the Russian Empire
Male classical pianists
Russian male classical composers
Emigrants from the Russian Empire to France
Naturalized citizens of France
Russian pianists
Composers for piano
Conductors (music) from the Russian Empire
Russian male conductors (music)
20th-century Russian male musicians
19th-century male musicians